Marc Kuchner (born August 7, 1972) is an American astrophysicist, a staff member at  NASA's Goddard Space Flight Center (GSFC) known for work on images and imaging of disks and exoplanets. Together with Wesley Traub, he invented the band-limited  coronagraph, a design for the proposed Terrestrial Planet Finder (TPF) telescope, also to be used on the James Webb Space Telescope (JWST). He is also known for his novel supercomputer models of planet-disk interactions and for developing the ideas of ocean planets, carbon planets, and helium planets. Kuchner appears as an expert commentator in the National Geographic television show "Alien Earths" and frequently answers the "Ask Astro" questions in Astronomy Magazine. He currently serves as the principal investigator of the citizen science websites Disk Detective and Backyard Worlds.

Background
Kuchner was born in Montreal, Quebec, Canada. He received his bachelor's degree in physics from Harvard in 1994 and his Ph.D. in astronomy from California Institute of Technology (Caltech) in 2000. His doctoral thesis advisor was Michael E. Brown. After he earned his Ph.D., Kuchner studied at the Center for Astrophysics  Harvard & Smithsonian as a Michelson Fellow, and then at Princeton University as a Hubble Fellow. Kuchner was awarded the 2009 SPIE early career achievement award for his work on coronagraphy.

Kuchner's parents are neurosurgeon Eugene Kuchner and psychologist Joan Kuchner.  His wife is epidemiologist Jennifer Nuzzo.

Marketing for Scientists
Kuchner is the author of a book, Marketing for Scientists: How to Shine in Tough Times (2011, Island Press).
The book provides career and communication advice for scientists using the language of marketing, with chapters on "business",  "how to sell something," "branding" and so on. This approach struck some reviewers as cynical about human nature. But readers from a wide spectrum of scientific disciplines praised the book's unique angle and breadth of research. Ecology described it as "a must-read for ecologists and, indeed, for all scientists, mathematicians, and engineers at all career stages." Astrophysicist Neil deGrasse Tyson called it, "the first of its kind".

References

External links
 www.marckuchner.com
 www.diskdetective.org
 NASA webpage. http://eud.gsfc.nasa.gov/Marc.Kuchner/home.html
 Marketing For Scientists

1972 births
Living people
American astronomers
NASA astrophysicists
Goddard Space Flight Center
Harvard University alumni
California Institute of Technology alumni
Scientists from Montreal